Kharada is a rural locality (a selo) in Shidibsky Selsoviet, Tlyaratinsky District, Republic of Dagestan, Russia. The population was 309 as of 2010.

Geography 
Kharada is located 26 km northwest of Tlyarata (the district's administrative centre) by road. Khadakolob is the nearest rural locality.

References 

Rural localities in Tlyaratinsky District